Hontecillas is a municipality in Cuenca, Castile-La Mancha, Spain. It has a population of 86.

References

External links

Municipalities in the Province of Cuenca